Rock The Bayou was a four-day rock festival celebrating the 1980s rock scene. From Houston, Texas the inaugural show took place from Labor Day weekend, August 29–September 1, 2008 on the  former location of Houston's AstroWorld theme park and featured a variety of musical acts from genres such as hard rock, heavy metal, glam metal, and classic rock.

The festival had more than 100 bands confirmed, contrary to initial estimates that 40 bands would be playing.

2008 main stage lineup

Over 100 bands appeared on four stages during the 4 days of Rock the Bayou. The headliners for the 2008 Rock the Bayou Concert were Queensrÿche, Sammy Hagar, Alice Cooper, and Bret Michaels.
Besides the main stage, there were a second and third stage of other bands.

The following bands have performed for the main stage from the Rock the Bayou website:

 Friday, August 29 — “Day 1”
 Queensrÿche
 Ratt
 Skid Row
 Y & T
 Lynch Mob
 Faster Pussycat
 Gilby Clarke
 Jetboy
 The Barfuss Boys

 Saturday, August 30 — “Day 2”
 Sammy Hagar
 Lita Ford
 Dokken
 Great White
 Enuff Z'Nuff
 Bullet Boys with Steven Adler
 Britny Fox
 Little Caesar

 Sunday, August 31 — “Day 3”
 Alice Cooper
 Warrant
 Yngwie Malmsteen
 Slaughter
 L.A. Guns
 Dangerous Toys
 Lillian Axe
 Black 'N Blue

 Monday, September 1 — Day 4
 Bret Michaels from Poison
 Gypsy Pistoleros
 Twisted Sister
 Jackyl
 KiX
 Firehouse
 Pretty Boy Floyd
 Bang Tango
 Broken Teeth

References

External links 
 

2008 in music
Heavy metal festivals in the United States
Music venues in Houston
Music festivals established in 2008
Rock festivals in the United States